The Leftovers is a 2011 novel by American author Tom Perrotta chronicling life on earth after a rapture-like event takes some and leaves others behind. The billions left behind are all touched by the loss of loved ones in the "Sudden Departure", compounded by the significant social and philosophical concerns and implications of what it means to be left behind, when others were chosen. A television adaptation premiered on HBO on June 29, 2014.

Plot
Several years after a rapture-like event in which millions of people worldwide suddenly vanish without explanation, the citizens of Mapleton are still struggling to cope with the massive loss and resulting culture shift. The story is told episodically, revolving around the four members of the Garvey family, who have each begun an unlikely relationship following the event.

Kevin Garvey, the patriarch of the Garvey family, is a prominent local businessman enjoying early retirement during the event. Afterwards, he is compelled to run for mayor of Mapleton to replace the psychologically compromised incumbent. Kevin stresses the importance of returning to normality as a way for the survivors to cope through initiatives like survivors' mixers and adult recreation leagues. The other major policy of his tenure in office is an effort to ease tension between the town and the Guilty Remnant (GR), an ascetic religious group that aims to provoke people into remembering the losses of the event and how meaningless life is. Following a violent conflict between police and the GR, Kevin has taken a hands off approach to their existence, preferring to ignore them entirely.

Kevin's wife leaves him to join the Guilty Remnant and he struggles to balance raising his daughter actively with respecting her privacy while she deals with the event and the breaking up of the Garvey family. He also finds he is unable to sustain new relationships with women, making a few failed attempts.  Kevin develops a relationship with Nora Durst, a woman who has become quasi famous in Mapleton for losing her husband and both children in the event. Nora suffers a major depressive episode following the loss of her family, obsessively watching her children's favorite TV show, avoiding the holidays, and riding her bike for hours at a time. Nora is dealt a further blow when the town pastor, who has become a muckraking amateur journalist to reconcile how the event may have invalidated his own beliefs, publishes a tract that reveals Nora's husband had been carrying on an affair with her children's much younger preschool teacher.

Kevin and Nora connect at a mixer after Nora confronts her former husband's mistress. Nora finds she has more sympathy than she expected with the woman over their mutual frustration with her husband's emotional distance and manipulation.  Nora pursues Kevin, who is hesitant, but impulsively agrees to take a trip to Florida with her. Afterwards they settle into a relationship, but Nora is bothered that she does not feel like the ‘good girlfriend’ she was always proud of being in college.  Their burgeoning relationship falls apart on Valentine's Day when Kevin breaks one of the conventions of their arrangement by sharing personal feelings about his family, which makes Nora uncomfortable. She leaves him at the restaurant when he goes to the restroom.

Kevin is served divorce papers by his wife, and realizes that his daughter is in danger of not graduating high school. He has fallen into a domestic routine with his daughter's friend, Aimee, who has been living with them, drinking coffee together in the morning before they both go to work.  Kevin is alarmed at the increasing flirtation between them, culminating that Spring. He resolves to avoid being alone with Aimee to suspend the flirtation.  The Spring softball league begins and even though his team is short handed Kevin plays anyway. He finds great satisfaction in the game and his ability to handle a fly ball, even in adverse conditions.

Nora decides to leave Mapleton and adopt a new identity. She bleaches her hair but finds it's difficult to completely shed her identity when it comes time to sell her house. She writes a letter to leave for Kevin, explaining why she ran from him.  In it, she is finally able to admit her ambivalence towards her family at the exact moment they disappeared, which had been a troubling source of guilt and anger. Opting to hand deliver the letter instead of mail it Nora discovers an infant left on the Garvey doorstep, instantly bonding with the child just as Kevin returns from his game.

Laurie Garvey, Kevin's wife, is a new recruit in the Guilty Remnant, a religious group she was initially skeptical of, but is recruited to after her best friend joins. The GR are mute, wear all white, must always smoke in public, and stage silent confrontations with the people of Mapleton.  Their goal is to remind everyone that they have been left behind in the event, and prevent the resumption of the status quo. After Laurie's integration into the group she is assigned a trainee, Meg.  Meg is younger and less emotionally stable than Laurie, frequently remembering the wedding she had been planning before joining the GR. The two form a strong friendship and perform their GR duties, following around townspeople and confronting people from their former lives. Meg must confront her former fiancé, who she is distressed to learn has begun new relationships and seems to have resumed his old life. Laurie is asked to serve her husband divorce papers to gain access to half of the family assets, because this is how the GR can afford to maintain operations. On Christmas Meg and Laurie visit Kevin.  He treats them like regular holiday visitors, and before they leave gives Laurie the gift their daughter left for her, a lighter. Touched by the gift, Laurie uses the lighter once, but then must throw it out to remain within the tenets of the GR.

Laurie and Meg are “promoted” to live in an outpost, a four-person dwelling that provides many of the comforts they lost living in Guilty Remnant dorms, like privacy, better food, a hot tub, soft beds and less supervision.   At first they are worried that living with the two men who already occupy the house will cause conflict and sexual tension, but the men are revealed to be in a secret romantic relationship and their personalities mesh well. One of the men is murdered while on their GR rounds, a troubling trend among the Remnant who resist all police investigation. Laurie's daughter, Jill, comes across the scene shortly after the murder and we learn that the GR has enacted a program in which one outpost member is commanded to kill the other as a sacrament.

Laurie and Meg grow closer living in the outpost alone, sharing the same bed and developing a nonsexual although romantic domestic union. The day comes when a new pair is introduced into the outpost, signaling the end of Laurie and Meg's time together. Laurie holds a gun to Meg's head but is unable to pull the trigger, even with Meg's encouragement that she will be delivered by the act. Meg takes the gun and shoots herself, which Laurie sees as a final act of love.  Collecting the gun Laurie is whisked away by a Guilty Remnant car, leaving town.

Jill Garvey, Kevin and Laurie's daughter, is a senior in high school who was smart and hardworking but is struggling in the post-rapture world, especially since her mother left the house to join the Guilty Remnant. Jill's new friend, Aimee, has moved into the house because she cannot live with her stepfather after her mother disappeared in the event. Aimee, also a senior, dresses provocatively and often encourages Jill to skip school and experiment (smoke weed, sex, etc.). The two attend regular parties at another teen's house, which always culminate in a variation of spin the bottle that pairs up the partygoers for random sexual encounters. The two girls carry on like this but find satisfaction in a happy “normal” Christmas spent exchanging gifts with Kevin. Kevin encourages the girls to resume their neglected educations; Jill agrees but Aimee decides to drop out to become a waitress. With Aimee more preoccupied with her job, Jill doesn't find the same amount of distraction when going to the same parties. She resolves that Aimee was the catalyst that made these events work with her talent for pushing things forward. Jill is distraught to learn that Laurie did not keep the lighter Jill got her for Christmas. She attends her last party and leaves early, opting to cut across a railyard instead of taking a ride from a set of twins Aimee is friends with. In the railyard Jill discovers the corpse of a GR member who she does not know had been her mother's housemate.

That spring Jill has a chance encounter with one of her favorite teachers who is now a member of the GR. Under the guise of helping Jill with school work, she is invited to attend a “sleep over” at the GR compound. Jill anticipates the stay and possibly seeing her mother again, packing her bags.  Meanwhile, Aimee's relationship with Kevin has become blurred and threatens to turn sexual. Aimee resolves to move out rather than escalate things with Kevin. Jill leaves for the GR compound without her father's knowledge, but on the way runs into the twins again, who invite her to play ping pong. She agrees and is hopeful that one of the twins seems to like her, realizing that in that moment she is happy.

Tom Garvey, the older of the two Garvey children, is in college during the event. He returns home after all the schools shut down in the aftermath and drinks every night at the local bar, sharing news that trickles back of who had been taken.  School resumes and Tom joins a fraternity which somewhat deifies one of their disappeared brothers. He becomes uninterested in school. One of his fraternity brothers reveals the fallacy of their fraternity's hero, and together they stumble across a New Age movement in which a man claims he can absorb the pain of others through hugs. Tom becomes wholly invested in the movement and climbs in the ranks, moving all over the country and cutting off almost all contact with his family.  In San Francisco the movement takes on cultish overtones that trouble Tom. He remains faithful to Holy Wayne, the group's leader, but is marginalized when he questions some new aspects of the group.

It is discovered that Holy Wayne has “spiritually married” a number of underage Asian girls and is being brought up on criminal charges. The “brides” are sent into hiding and Tom is tasked with transporting one of them, Christine, across the country to Boston. They must travel in secret because Christine is pregnant and concrete proof of the charges against Wayne. In turn the group, including Christine, believes she is carrying the son of God.

Tom and Christine disguise themselves as members of a free love movement, the Barefoot People, and travel by foot and bus across country. They become close friends and easily fall into their cover story of a romantically linked couple. On a bus trip they accidentally convert a soldier into a Barefoot person, a group they don't actually belong to. Arriving in Boston is a disappointment to Tom, who now has to share Christine with the Holy Wayne couple that has been charged with overseeing the delivery of their Messiah. Tom enjoys spending time in the contemplative Barefoot People community and maintains his cover. Shortly before Christine delivers her child, a girl, Holy Wayne admits guilt and repents for his crimes. The Holy Wayne community is shattered, and Christine is despondent.

Christine wants to return home to Ohio because she doesn't know what else to do, and Tom takes her. He plans on stopping off in Mapleton to see his family again, hoping that it will encourage Christine, who has little interest in her daughter. At a rest stop Tom forces Christine to interact with her child, but when he leaves them to use the restroom she abandons Tom and her child to join a group of Barefoot People. Tom takes the baby with him to Mapleton and is surprised to see the town has not changed in his absence. He leaves the baby on his father's doorstep, knowing she will be well looked after, and leaves to pursue Christine and a life as a Barefoot Person.

Television adaptation

HBO acquired rights for a TV series with Perrotta attached as writer/executive producer and Ron Yerxa and Albert Berger as executive producers in August 2011, shortly before the book came out. Damon Lindelof is also the co-creator of the project with Perrotta and was the showrunner and a writer on the series.

The series followed Justin Theroux as Kevin Garvey, a father of two and the chief of police, picking up three years after two percent of the world's population abruptly disappears without explanation.  The first season loosely followed the stories in the book. The series finale aired June 4, 2017.

References

2011 American novels
Novels about missing people
Novels by Tom Perrotta
Dystopian novels
St. Martin's Press books